Forbidden Trails is a 1941 American Western film directed by Robert N. Bradbury and written by Adele Buffington. This is the third film in Monogram Pictures' Rough Riders series, and stars Buck Jones as Marshal Buck Roberts, Tim McCoy as Marshal Tim McCall and Raymond Hatton as Marshal Sandy Hopkins, with Christine McIntyre, Dave O'Brien and Tris Coffin. The film was released on December 25, 1941, by Monogram Pictures.

Plot
Two outlaws are released from prison, now they seek revenge on Buck Roberts, the Marshall that had them arrested in the first place. When their attempt on his life fails, Roberts joins up with McCall and Hopkins and goes after the criminals.

Cast          
Buck Jones as Buck Roberts
Tim McCoy as Tim McCall
Raymond Hatton as Sandy Hopkins
Christine McIntyre as Mary Doran
Dave O'Brien as Jim Cramer
Tris Coffin as Ed Nelson 
Charles King as Fulton 
Bud Osborne as Joe Howard 
Lynton Brent as Bill Tooley 
Jerry Sheldon as Sam
Silver as Silver

See also
The Rough Riders series:
 Arizona Bound
 The Gunman from Bodie
 Forbidden Trails
 Below the Border
 Ghost Town Law
 Down Texas Way
 Riders of the West
 West of the Law

References

External links
 

1941 films
1940s English-language films
American Western (genre) films
1941 Western (genre) films
Monogram Pictures films
Films directed by Robert N. Bradbury
American black-and-white films
1940s American films